East Forsyth High School is a newly constructed high school in northeastern Forsyth County, Georgia. Forsyth County Schools District hosted the grand opening of East Forsyth High School on July 14, 2021, at 10:30 am. The high school was built to relieve overcrowding in the district's North Forsyth High School and Forsyth Central High School. The school has been in development for more than a decade as of 2019. Forsyth County Schools officially broke ground on the project on May 21, 2018, tweeting "What a beautiful day for the groundbreaking ceremony at East Forsyth HS!  Our 7th traditional high school is projected to open fall 2021."

Funds for the new school are to come from a $295,000,000 school bond approved by voters in May 2018.

East Forsyth has an entirely new and unique career development program, not found in any of the other schools in the district, to further enhance the educational opportunities for students.

In 2022, the principal said the n-word which caused an uproar in the community.

Design 
Jennifer Caracciolo, director of communications for Forsyth County Schools explained that East Forsyth High School will be designed in a similar fashion to that of Denmark High School, the district's sixth traditional high school which opened in August 2018. The school will boast a navy and orange color scheme unlike any of the color combinations in any other Forsyth County Schools high school. The official school mascot will be the Broncos.

East Forsyth High School Sketch Plat 
The sketch plat for East Forsyth High School has been published.

Architects 
East Forsyth High School is being built with the help of BRPH, an architectural, engineering and design firm.

School Features 
East Forsyth High School will have a variety of features found in many of the district's schools.
 
Per the official sketch plat the school will include:

 4 Tennis Courts
 741 Total Parking Spaces
 80 Yard Practice P.E. Field
 Football Stadium
 Baseball Field
 Fast pitch softball field
 2.6 Acre P.E. Field
Central courtyard with spots of turf and a sunken seating area to create a gathering space for students.

References 

Public high schools in Georgia (U.S. state)
Schools in Forsyth County, Georgia
Buildings and structures under construction in the United States